Pasiphila derasata is a species of moth in the family Geometridae. It is found in Africa, south of the Sahara, including the Islands of the Atlantic Ocean (Cabo Verde) and the island of the Indian Ocean.

The edge of the forewings of the males have a convex shape that makes it easy to distinguish them from the females.

References

External links

derasata
Moths described in 1905
Moths of Cape Verde
Moths of Madagascar
Moths of Mauritius
Moths of Réunion
Moths of Africa